Lipienica  is a village in the administrative district of Gmina Kamienna Góra, within Kamienna Góra County, Lower Silesian Voivodeship, in south-western Poland.

It lies between Krzeszów and Lubawka.

External links
 Lipienica

Lipienica